Daniel Louis Schneider (born August 29, 1942) is an American former professional baseball player. He played in Major League Baseball as a left-handed pitcher between 1963 and 1969 for the Milwaukee Braves and the Houston Astros.

Career
Schneider was a strong left-handed pitcher who played for Rincon High School (Tucson, Arizona) and the University of Arizona, where he made the 1962 College All-American Team. In June 1962, Schneider was signed by the Milwaukee Braves. He played with them through the 1966 season (when the team moved to Atlanta) and then was traded to the
Houston Astros. His professional career lasted nine seasons, 1962–1970. In 117 Major League games played, eight as a starting pitcher, Schneider allowed 185 hits and 70 bases on balls in 166 innings pitched. He notched 86 strikeouts and two saves. 

Schneider was inducted into the University of Arizona Hall of Fame in 2019.

References

External links 

 Dan Schneider's career statistics at Sports Illustrated

1942 births
Living people
All-American college baseball players
Arizona Wildcats baseball players
Atlanta Braves players
Atlanta Crackers players
Baseball players from Indiana
Columbus Jets players
Denver Bears players
Houston Astros players
Louisville Colonels (minor league) players
Major League Baseball pitchers
Milwaukee Braves players
Oklahoma City 89ers players
Richmond Braves players
Sportspeople from Evansville, Indiana
Toronto Maple Leafs (International League) players
Tulsa Oilers (baseball) players